Shree Sankhar Mohami Secondary School is a  government school situated at Mohami, Sankhar VDC-4, Syangja District, Gandaki Zone, Nepal. It was founded in 1958 AD.
This school has been running from class 1 to class 10. This school has been providing education to more than 400 students of Sankhar VDC.

Magazine
 Golden Jubilee is published in 2010.

See also
 List of schools in Nepal
 School Leaving Certificate (Nepal)

References

Schools in Nepal
1958 establishments in Nepal
Buildings and structures in Syangja District